Several supranational elections were held in 2014.

May
 4 May: Panama, Elections for the Central American Parliament
 22–25 May: European Union, European Parliament

June
 11 June: United Nations General Assembly, United Nations General Assembly President

October
 United Nations Security Council, Security Council

November
 United Nations Human Rights Council, Human Rights Council

References

2014 elections
Supranational elections